is a Japanese artist best known for his Peanuts-inspired work. Otani is the creator of much of the artwork found in the Charles M. Schulz Museum and Research Center.

An exhibit of Otani's Peanuts-themed charcoal ink paintings, Peanuts: Found in Translation, was presented at the Schulz Museum from November 12, 2004, to April 11, 2005.

References

External links
 Otani at the Schulz Museum
 Otani's Peanuts: Found in Translation

Living people
Peanuts (comic strip)
Japanese painters
Japanese sculptors
Japanese illustrators
1958 births